Cochleatina is an organic-walled microfossil ('Small Carbonaceous Fossil') known from the late Ediacaran period and early Cambrian Fortunian Stage.  Cochleatina comprises a complex spiral ribbon structure, with a serrated outer margin. These spirals are frequently found embedded in an organic sheet. Cochleatina is a rare example of a fossil taxon known to span the Ediacaran–Cambrian boundary.

Affinity
Cochleatina's biological affinity is unknown. It has been variously regarded as the fossil remains of an animal, an algae, or a protist.

References

Incertae sedis
Ediacaran life